Oliveroline is an anti-cholinergic aporphine alkaloid.

References

Benzodioxoles
Aporphine alkaloids